Asante Haughton is a Jamaican-born Toronto-based human rights and mental health advocate and the co-founder of Reach Out Response Network.

Family life 
Haughton was born Jamaica before moving to Toronto with mother where he was a gifted student. He has two brothers.

Haughton speaks openly about his depression and anxiety which developed from his experiences as a 10th-grade student when his mother tried to take her own life, but ended up instead hospitalized for months.

He used poetry and rap as an outlet for his emotions and excelled at basketball before getting help from his family doctor.

Career and activism 
Haughton is the manager of peer support training at Stella's Place youth mental health organization in Toronto and a mental health consultant for Vice.

He co-founded Reach Out Response Network with Rachel Bromberg in 2020 and contracted COVID-19 the same year.

He does research with the Centre for Addiction and Mental Health.

Music career 
Haughton raps and has collaborated with Toronto rapper Derek Christoff.

Publications 

 Haughton wrote the foreword for Brainstorm Revolution: True mental health stories of love, personal evolution, and cultural revolution, 2018 ISBN 978-1894813952
 Haughton, A, Ashcroft, R, Menear, M, Greenblatt, A, et al. Patient perspectives on quality of care for depression and anxiety in primary health care teams: A qualitative study. Health Expectations. 2021; 24: 1168– 1177. https://doi.org/10.1111/hex.13242
 Ferrari, M., Flora, N., Anderson, K.K., Haughton, A., Tuck, A., Archie, S., Kidd, S., McKenzie, K. and (2018), Gender differences in pathways to care for early psychosis. Early Intervention in Psychiatry, 12: 355-361. https://doi.org/10.1111/eip.12324
 The alternative to calling the police during a mental health crisis, Toronto Star, 2020

References

External links 

 Official website
 His Ted Talk

Living people
Jamaican emigrants to Canada
Mental health activists
Mental health in Canada
21st-century Canadian rappers
21st-century Canadian writers
Year of birth missing (living people)
Canadian male rappers
Black Canadian musicians